Xtabentum: A Novel of Yucatan is a novel published in 2011 by first-time Mexican Yucatan American novelist Rosy Hugener, who resides in Long Grove, Illinois.

Story
Xtabentum: A Novel of Yucatan is a story of two young women set in the years following the Mexican Revolution in Mérida, Yucatán, one of the wealthiest cities in the world at the time. Amanda Diaz is from the “divine caste”, a small group of families of European descent who dominate the politics and economy of the region. Carmen, Amanda’s lifelong friend, is from the opposite end of the social spectrum, a Mayan Indian who is the daughter of one of the Diaz family servants. Against the true historical background of rebellion and assassination in the unstable country, the whipping of Carmen by a Diaz neighbor exposes the sheltered existence of the two women and drives them apart. The story follows Amanda through her horror at the social injustice of the two-class Mexico to the sacrifices she makes in the name of friendship. Parts of the story take place in modern times, where the discovery of an old birth certificate sets Amanda’s granddaughter in search of a secret about her father’s birth. Her search, told in the first person, is blended with a third-person account of the lives of Amanda and her contemporaries in the 1920s.

Historical note
The characters Felipe Carrillo Puerto and Alma Reed are true historical figures.  Carrillo Puerto was a progressive governor of Yucatan and is still honored by the indigenous people of the region.  His downfall and death were as depicted in Xtabentum.  Alma Reed was famous in her own right; she campaigned successfully as a journalist against the death penalty for minors in California and worked tirelessly for the restoration to Mexico of Mayan relics.
While Carlos Ancona is fictional, his father Eligio Ancona and his brother Antonio Ancona are historical figures, and are the great-great-grandfather and great-grandfather, respectively, of author Rosa Hugener.  Some of Carlos Ancona’s background, including being the personal journalist of Pancho Villa during the Mexican Revolution, was actually lived by Antonio Ancona and passed as family lore to his descendants.
The book has Maya numerals at the beginning of the chapters.

References

Novels set in Mexico
2011 novels